James Clegg may refer to:
 James Clegg (minister) (1679–1755), English Presbyterian minister and author
 James S. Clegg (born 1933),  professor of biochemistry at University of California, Davis
 James Clegg (swimmer) (born 1994), British Paralympic swimmer